Speechlessness of Sadness (Hüznün Sözyitimleri)  is a volume of modern Turkish poetry by Seyhan Kurt. It was published in 1998. It consists of three parts "Deterritorial", "Agnostic" and Incognitae."

Turkish poetry